Vejdirektoratet or the Danish Road Directorate is responsible for the national road network of Denmark, which comprises motorways, a number of main roads and many of the country's bridges – a total of about 4,000 kilometres.

Tasks 
Road Directorate's work consists primarily of three elements:
 Planning
 Construction and operation
 Traffic and management

Organisation 
The structure of the Directorate includes;
 General Directorate (including procurement and supplier management, human resources, and communication)
 Planning (including safety and environment)
 Construction
 Traffic operations
 Resources (including finance and IT)

The Danish Road Directorate is based at six service centres across the country and forms part of the  Danish Ministry of Transport, Building and Housing.

References

External links 

 Official website
 Official ministry website

Road authorities
Government agencies of Denmark
Government agencies established in 1949
1949 establishments in Denmark
Transport organizations based in Denmark